Smith Westerns is the self-titled debut album by the indie rock band Smith Westerns, released on June 5, 2009 on HoZac Records and in 2010 on Fat Possum Records.

Track listing

References

2009 debut albums
Smith Westerns albums
Fat Possum Records albums